Bembix americana is a species of sand wasp in the family Crabronidae. It is found in the Caribbean Sea, Central America, North America, and South America.

Subspecies
These seven subspecies belong to the species Bembix americana:
 Bembix americana americana Fabricius, 1793
 Bembix americana antilleana Evans & Matthews, 1968
 Bembix americana comata J. Parker, 1917
 Bembix americana dugi Menke, 1985
 Bembix americana hamata C. Fox, 1923
 Bembix americana nicolai Cockerell, 1938
 Bembix americana spinolae Lepeletier, 1845

References

External links

Crabronidae
Articles created by Qbugbot
Insects described in 1793